Uitkerke is in West Flanders and is part of the coastal city of Blankenberge, Belgium. The two neighboring communities were officially united in the early 1970s.

History
Uitkerke, as an  independent village, is more than a thousand years old. Historically, since its main occupation was agriculture, it once occupied more in territory than its neighbor, Blankenberge.

Derivation
Translated from the Flemish Uitkerke means "outer church".

Populated places in West Flanders
Blankenberge